Afghanistan competed at the 2018 Asian Games in Jakarta and Palembang, Indonesia, from 18 August to 2 September 2018. Afghanistan first participated at the Asian Games since the first Games in 1951 Delhi, and have collected five silver and 6 bronze medals until the last event in 2014 Incheon.

Medalists

The following Afghanistan competitors won medals at the Games.

|  style="text-align:left; width:78%; vertical-align:top;"|

|  style="text-align:left; width:22%; vertical-align:top;"|

Competitors 
The following is a list of the number of competitors representing Afghanistan that participated at the Games:

 Athlete who also competed in kurash.

Athletics 

 Key

 Note–Ranks given for track events are within the athlete's heat only
 Q = Qualified for the next round
 q = Qualified for the next round as a fastest loser or, in field events, by position without achieving the qualifying target
 NR = National record
 GR = Games record
 PB = Personal best
 SB = Season best
 DNF = Did not finish
 DNS = Did not start
 NM = No mark
 N/A = Round not applicable for the event
 Bye = Athlete not required to compete in round

Track & road events

Badminton 

Singles

Basketball 

Summary

3x3 basketball
Afghanistan national 3x3 team participated in the Games, the men's team placed in the pool D based on the FIBA 3x3 federation ranking.

Men's tournament

Roster
The following is the Afghanistan roster in the men's 3x3 basketball tournament of the 2018 Asian Games.
Mir Abdul Wahab Mirzad
Sayed Amin Sadat
Jahan Zeeb Khairi

Pool D

Boxing 

Men

Ju-jitsu 

Afghanistan entered the ju-jitsu competition with 7 athletes (5 men's and 2 women's).

Men

Women

Judo 

Afghanistan put up 4 men's judokas at the Games.

Men

Karate 

Afghanistan entered the karate competition with 6 athletes (4 men's and 2 women's).

Kurash 

Men

Women

Paragliding 

Men

Women

Rugby sevens 

Afghanistan rugby sevens men's team drawn in the group C at the Games.

Men's tournament 

Squad
The following is the Afghanistan squad in the men's rugby sevens tournament of the 2018 Asian Games.

Head coach: Haris Rahamni

Mohammad Asghar Azizi
Abdul Bari Gazang
Mohammad Moosa Hashimi
Javed Rahmani
Mustafa Sayed
Naib Shah Shirzad
Sayear Slaimankhel
Zakir Slaimankhel
Omar Slaimankhel
Sabir Slaimankhel
Zahidullah Slaimankhel
M Mussa Wardak

Group C

Classification round (9–12)

Sambo

Swimming 

Afghanistan National Swimming Federation entered one swimmer to compete at the Games.

Men

Taekwondo 

Kyorugi

Volleyball

Beach volleyball

Weightlifting 

Men

Wrestling 

Men's freestyle

Wushu 

Taolu

Sanda

Key: * TV – Technical victory.

See also 
 Afghanistan at the 2018 Asian Para Games

References 

Nations at the 2018 Asian Games
2018
Asian Games